Will Brenton is a writer/producer-director who has worked in many areas of television and theatre, primarily through his companies Tell-Tale productions and Wish Films, both of which he founded with Iain Lauchlan. Together they gained six BAFTA nominations, as well as many other awards for their work together.
They won a 2000 BAFTA, Best Pre-School Live Action.

They first met as presenters on the BBC children's programme Playbus, where they presented the Tent Stop together. From there they went on the write and appear in the pantomimes at the Belgrade Theatre in Coventry, from 1991 up to 2000. These pantomimes are still performed all over the UK today by Imagine Theatre. During that time they created and produced many of the UK's favourite TV shows for children, including The Tweenies, Fun Song Factory, Boo! and BB3B! Later, as Wish Films, they also created 'Jim Jam and Sunny' for ITV.

Brenton also directed Coronation Street and Emmerdale in the nineties, and in 2010 he co-wrote and directed the very successful Dr Who live tour, 'The Monsters Are Coming' starring Nigel Planer, a sixteen-piece rock band playing the music of Murray Gold and playing in arenas all over the UK.

Will has also written books for children, his first titles Claude and 'Elephant White' being released in 2011–2012, published by Egmont and Templar respectively.

More recently Brenton has continued writing and directing shows for the Arena circuit, including 'Cbeebies - Stars' 'Justin and Friends' 'Cbeebies The Big Band' as well as writing and directing live shows for The Hairy Bikers and directing David Hasselhoff in 'Peter Pan' at the Opera House in Manchester.

In 2015 Will Brenton will be writing and directing the next Basil Brush Live show and the next 'Justin and Friends - Mr Tumble's Circus' arena tour.

He has also developed and produced Melody, a show for CBeebies about a partially sighted girl and the stories she imagines when listening to classical music. A second series was produced in the Autumn of 2014.

Lauchlan left Wish Films in 2009, and Will ran the company with Helen Cadwallader. They went on to produce a TV adaptation of Mick Inkpen's 'Wibbly Pig' books (nominated for a Gemini in Canada) and An Vrombaut's 'Dear Dragon' books, which have appeared on Disney UK as 'Florrie's Dragons'.

References

External links
http://www.imdb.com/name/nm0107625/
http://www.wishfilms.com
http://www.willbrenton.com

Living people
British television writers
British television directors
British children's writers
Year of birth missing (living people)
Place of birth missing (living people)